The 1936 United States presidential election in Oklahoma took place on November 3, 1936, as part of the 1936 United States presidential election. Voters chose 11 representatives, or electors, to the Electoral College, who voted for president and vice president.

Oklahoma was won by incumbent President Franklin D. Roosevelt (D–New York), running with Vice President John Nance Garner, with 66.83 percent of the popular vote, against Governor Alf Landon (R–Kansas), running with Frank Knox, with 32.69 percent of the popular vote.

To date, the 1936 election is the last in which the following counties voted for a Democratic Presidential candidate: Alfalfa, Blaine, Ellis, Garfield, Kingfisher, Tulsa, Washington and Woodward.

Results

Results by county

See also
 United States presidential elections in Oklahoma

References

Oklahoma
1936
1936 Oklahoma elections